Motif may refer to:

General concepts 
 Motif (chess composition), an element of a move in the consideration of its purpose
 Motif (folkloristics), a recurring element that creates recognizable patterns in folklore and folk-art traditions
 Motif (music), a salient recurring fragment or succession of notes 
 Motif (narrative), any recurring element in a story that has symbolic significance or the reason behind actions
 Motif (textile arts), a recurring element or fragment that, when joined together, creates a larger work
 Motif (visual arts), a repeated theme or pattern

Biochemistry 
 Sequence motif, a sequence pattern of nucleotides in a DNA sequence or amino acids in a protein
 Short linear motif, a stretch of protein sequence that mediates protein–protein interaction
 Structural motif, a pattern in a protein structure formed by the spatial arrangement of amino acids

Other uses 
 Motif (2019 film), 2019 Malaysian Malay-language crime drama film
 Motif (album), a 2008 album by guitarist Steve Howe
 Motif (band), a Swedish experimental jazz band
 Motif (software), a GUI specification and widget toolkit for Unix
 Network motif, patterns (sub-graphs) that recur more often than expected
 Yamaha Motif, a series of music workstations

See also 
 Meme
 Motive (disambiguation)